Sports Hub Bangladesh is an annual conference of sports governing body personnel, sports professionals, organizers, sports personalities and sports enthusiasts. The goal of the initiative is to bring together all the stakeholders of the Bangladesh sports industry and give them a platform to network. Young students, sports enthusiasts will have the opportunity to register as participants and learn about the nuances of the sports industry from the experts.

First sports business conference of Bangladesh

On September 23, 2017, Imago Sports organized the first sports business conference of Bangladesh. Sports Industry stalwarts and marketing experts shared their take on current trends in Sports Marketing, Club & Franchise Management, Sports Journalism and Bangladesh Football. Followed by the sessions, a Sports Business Idea Competition for university students was organized. More than 400 participants were present during the event.

The conference (2017)

Speakers: Session on Club & Franchise Management
Nafeesa Kamal, Owner, Comilla Victorians
Kazi Inam Ahmed, Khulna Titans
Tahmeed Azizul Huq, CEO, Rajshahi Kings

Speaker: Life After Cricket
Khaled Mahmud Sujon, Former Captain of Bangladesh national cricket team

Speaker: Football: Going Back to the Roots
Tabith Awal, Vice President, Bangladesh Football Federation

Speakers: Session on Sports Journalism 101
Dilu Khandakar, sports editor, Channel 24
Sayeeduzzaman, sports editor, Kaler Kantho
Mazhar Uddin, sports reporter, The Daily Star

Speaker: A True Fan:Do's and Don'ts
Zunaid Paiker, President, Bangladesh Cricket Supporters Association (BCSA)

Speakers: Session on Sports Marketing
Obeid Nizam, CEO, Dhaka Dynamites
Nazim Farhan Chowdhury, managing director, Adcomm Ltd
Iresh Zaker, executive director, Asiatic 360
Rabeth Khan, CEO, Macomm/Dentsu and Media axis/Carat-Dentsu Aegis Network

References 

Sport in Bangladesh